The Deccan fan-throated lizard (Sarada deccanensis) is a species of agamid lizard endemic to India.

Descriptions

Deccan fan-throated lizard is a small-sized lizard found in South Asia. Genus sarada is a sister group to genus sitana endemic to India, described  by researchers after studying the scale patterns, skeletal structure and other external features. The male of this species displays a brightly colored dewlap during the  mating season. Males are mostly active during the hot summer months. Currently, there are 5 different types of fan-throated lizards from genus Sarada described from India. Out of which, including Sarada deccanensis, sarada superba is found in western ghats.

References

Sarada
Reptiles of India
Reptiles described in 1870
Taxa named by Thomas C. Jerdon